Heron's Head Park is a public park in San Francisco, California; maintained by the San Francisco Port Authority. The park is about 22 acres in size. It is based in a wetland and is known for its bird watching. The park is home to The EcoCenter, an environmental education facility.

History 
The area use to be called "Pier 98". In 1998, some 5,000 tons of garbage and waste was cleared to make room for picnic areas, hiking paths, and native plants. There are 8 acres of intertidal marsh in the park.

Improvements were completed in 2012, to add walking and bicycle facilities. From 2020 until 2022, the park underwent a project to stop the eroding shoreline by planting more native plants.

References

Parks in San Francisco
San Francisco Bay Trail
Bayview–Hunters Point, San Francisco